Milenino is a rural locality and the administrative center of Mileninsky Selsoviet Rural Settlement, Fatezhsky District, Kursk Oblast, Russia. The population as of 2010 is 295.

Geography 
The village is located on the Usozha River (a left tributary of the Svapa in the basin of the Seym), 106 km from the Russia–Ukraine border, 44 km north-west of Kursk, 1.5 km east of the district center – the town Fatezh.

Climate
Milenino has a warm-summer humid continental climate (Dfb in the Köppen climate classification).

Transport 
Milenino is located 1 km from the federal route  Crimea Highway as part of the European route E105, 27 km from the road of regional importance  (Kursk – Ponyri), 4 km from the road  (Fatezh – 38K-018), on the road of intermunicipal significance  (Fatezh – Milenino), 1.5 km from the road  (M2 "Crimea Highway" – Zykovka – Maloye Annenkovo – 38K-039), on the road  (38N-210 – Bugry), 28 km from the nearest railway station Vozy (railway line Oryol – Kursk).

The rural locality is situated 45 km from Kursk Vostochny Airport, 166 km from Belgorod International Airport and 231 km from Voronezh Peter the Great Airport.

References

Notes

Sources

Rural localities in Fatezhsky District